Nebula Genomics is a personal genomics company based in San Francisco, California. It offers a whole-genome sequencing service.

History 
Nebula Genomics was co-founded in 2018 by George Church, geneticist at Harvard Medical School. In August 2018, Nebula Genomics announced a seed funding round of $4.3 million led by Khosla Ventures. In September 2019, the company announced it intended to deploy an anonymous genetic testing service. In February 2020, Nebula Genomics began offering high-coverage whole-genome sequencing for $299 internationally. The service also requires a subscription to Nebula Explore.
On 11 August 2021, ProPhase Labs, a diversified medical science and technology company, announced the acquisition of Nebula Genomics by its recently formed subsidiary, ProPhase Precision Medicine, Inc., for about $14.6 million in a combination of ProPhase Labs common stock and cash.

Privacy concerns

Relationship with BGI Group 

BGI Group is a Chinese life sciences company that has been part of many controversies, especially regarding genetic data. One of these concerns one of the most popular prenatal test in the world, Reuters found out that it has been developed with the involvement of Chinese's army, People's Liberation Army (PLA), and has been used to collect genetic data from millions of women. George Church, the co-founder of Nebula Genomics, has served on the BGI Group's scientific advisory board since 2007. In 2017, BGI established the George Church Institute of Regenesis, a research collaboration between Church’s lab and about a dozen staffers at BGI in China. On 18 February 2020, Nebula Genomics has also announced that has partnered up with BGI: the salive samples sent for decoding to Nebula Genomics are then sent by the company to BGI labs in Hong Kong for sequencing, although nowadays Nebula Genomics states in its FAQs that the samples are sequenced in Europe. Nebula Genomics said that this partnership is made to bring down the cost of whole-genome sequencing since normally it has a cost that makes it inaccessible to most people.

Use by law enforcement and risk of data breaches 
Nebula Genomics says that it is developing its own blockchain to enforce security and privacy but, despite that, re-identification of people starting from the genetic data could still be possible (DNA itself is a unique identifier), law enforcement could still issue search warrants or subpoena the data and this technology, given also the fact that is hard to implement, could still be vulnerable to data breaches. This is also stated in Nebula Genomics' Privacy Policy: "However, under certain circumstances your genetic information may be subject to processing pursuant to laws, regulations or judicial or governmental orders, warrants or subpoenas. In other words, a lawful demand by public authorities may require we share your personal Information", they also state that: "We may share your personal data if we believe it is reasonably necessary to enforce the Nebula Terms and Conditions, protect the security and integrity of our Services, or protect the rights, safety, or property of Nebula, our employees or users". About data breaches risk it's written that: "While we cannot guarantee that loss, access or misuse of data will not occur, we use reasonable efforts to prevent these outcomes."

Technology 
Nebula Genomics develops technologies to enable controllable, transparent and secure genomic data sharing. It is also developing approaches for privacy-preserving analysis of genomic datasets.

Awards 
In 2019, Nebula Genomics won the “Best-in-Show” award at the SXSW Pitch competition, part of the South by Southwest festival.

References

External links 
Nebula Explore 
Review of Nebula Genomics

Genetic genealogy companies
Biotechnology companies of the United States
2018 establishments in California